Howie is a Scottish locational surname derived from a medieval estate in Ayrshire, southwest Scotland.  While its ancient name is known as "The lands of How", its exact location is lost to time. The word "How", predating written history, appears to originate from the ancient Kingdom of Strathclyde as a locational description of a "hollow" (deep valley). The alternate spelling of Howie is "Howey".  The oldest public record of the surname dates to 1526 in the town of Brechin.  People with the surname or its variant include:

 Al Howie (1945–2016), Canadian athlete
 Alison Howie (born 1991), Scottish field hockey player
 Archibald Howie (born 1934), British physicist
 Forbes Howie (1920–2000), Scottish businessman
 George Howie (1899–1979), American racecar driver
 Gillian Howie, British philosopher
 Gordon Howie (born 1949), American politician
 Hugh Howie (1924–1958), Scottish footballer
 James Howie (disambiguation)
 John Howie (biographer) (1735–1793), Scottish biographer
 John Howie (businessman) (1833–1895), Scottish businessman
 John Mackintosh Howie (1936–2011), Scottish mathematician
 Robert Howie (born 1929), Canadian politician
 Robert Howie (businessman) (1846–1927), Scottish businessman
 Thomas D. Howie (1908–1944), American army officer
 Thomas W. Howie (1856–1927), Scottish businessman
 William Howie, Baron Howie of Troon (1924–2018), British politician
 Benjamin Franklin Howey (1828–1895), American politician
 Hugh Howey (born 1975), American author
 Kate Howey (born 1973), British judoka
 Lee Howey (born 1969), English footballer
 Peter Howey (born 1958), English footballer
 Steve Howey (actor) (born 1977), American actor
 Steve Howey (footballer) (born 1971), English footballer

Fictional characters
Howie Hardy, a composer and musician in the 1987-1996 animated Teenage Mutant Ninja Turtles TV series
Sergeant Neil Howie of the West Highland Constabulary, the mainland policeman who visits an isolated Hebridean island in search of a missing girl in the 1973 film The Wicker Man

References